Minquan was a gunboat of the Republic of China Navy (ROCN). It was constructed at the Jiangnan Shipyard and completed in 1930. During the Second World War, it was part of the ROCN's Second Squadron.

References

Notes

Sources

Ships of the Republic of China Navy
1929 ships